Joo-won is a Korean unisex given name. Its meaning differs based on the hanja used to write each syllable of the name. There are 56 hanja with the reading "joo" and 35 hanja with the reading "won" on the South Korean government's official list of hanja which may be registered for use in given names. It was the second-most popular name for newborn boys in South Korea in 2011, and came in fifth place in 2015.

People with this name include:

Gim Ju-won (fl. 780), Silla male nobleman
Chun Joo-weon (born 1972), South Korean female basketball player
Kim Joo-won (born 1977), South Korean prima ballerina
Go Joo-won (born 1981), South Korean male actor
Moon Joo-won (born 1983), South Korean male football player

See also
List of Korean given names

References

Korean unisex given names